Blair Community Schools is a school district headquartered in Blair, Nebraska.

Schools
Blair High School
Otte Blair Middle School
Arbor Park Intermediate School
Elementary schools:
Deerfield Primary School
North Primary School
South Primary School

References

External links
 Blair Community Schools
School districts in Nebraska
Education in Washington County, Nebraska